Anurag (Devanagari: अनुराग) (pronounced "Anurāg"), sometimes shorted Anu, is a common Indian first name. There are various meanings of Anurag in Sanskrit such as attachment, devotion, passion and eternal love.

Notable people named Anurag include:
 Anurag Basu, Bollywood film director, actor and producer
 Anurag Dikshit, billionaire Indian businessman, co-founder of PartyGaming
 Anurag Kashyap (director), Hindi film screenwriter-director, including Black Friday and Dev D (2009)
 Anurag Singh (director), film director from Punjab
 Anurag Kumar, Professor and Chairman of the Department of Electrical Communication at Indian Institute of Science
 Anurag Anand, author of books like The Legend of Amrapali (2012) and The Quest for Nothing (2010)
 Anurag Mathur, writer, author of the 1991 novel The Inscrutable Americans

See also
 Anu (name), a given name and surname found independently in several cultures

Indian masculine given names